A Tear and a Smile is an album by English singer Linda Lewis, released in 1982. Lewis’ eighth album.

Track listing

Side One
"This Boy" - (Linda Lewis, Bill Amesbury)
"Destination Love" - (Diane Warren)
"(Close the Door) Take Your Heart" - (Allee Willis, David Lasley)
"Don't Let It Go" - (Soo Jeffers, Stephen Rutledge)
"I Am What I Am" - (Colin Campsie, George McFarlane, Billy Lyall)

Side Two
"Take Me For a Little While" - (Trade Martin)
"You Don't Know What You're Missing" - (Barbara Morr, Kathy Ingraham)
"Why Can't I Be The Other Woman" - (Linda Lewis, Toni Attell)
"Sweet Heartache" - (Linda Lewis)
"I Can't Get Enough" - (Linda Lewis)

2012 Re-master cd bonus tracks
"Come On Back" - (Linda Lewis)
"I Can Take It" - (Linda Lewis, Bill Amesbury)
"Class/Style (I've Got It)" (12" groove mix) - (D McGarry, D Parton, L Hunt)
"You Turned My Bitter Into Sweet" - (Pipkin, Pipkin, Gordan)
"Class/Style (I've Got It)" (single version) - (D McGarry, D Parton, L Hunt)

References
The Guinness Book of British Hit Albums, fifth edition, 1992
http://www.allmusic.com/album/a-tear-and-a-smile-mw0000843674
original record sleeve notes

1982 albums
Linda Lewis albums